The 2022 Florida State Seminoles football team represented Florida State University during the 2022 NCAA Division I FBS football season. The Seminoles played their home games at Doak Campbell Stadium in Tallahassee, Florida, and competed as members of the Atlantic Coast Conference. They were led by head coach Mike Norvell, in his third season.

Previous season 
In the 2021 season, the Seminoles began the season 0-4, which included a narrow overtime loss to Notre Dame and a shocking upset by FCS Jacksonville State. However, the Seminoles turned it around finishing the season 5-3, and going 4-4 in ACC play, ending the season with a 24-20 loss to rival Florida to eliminate them from bowl contention and ending the season with a 5-7 record.

Schedule

Game summaries

Duquesne

vs. LSU

at Louisville

Boston College

No. 22 Wake Forest

at No. 14 NC State

No. 4 Clemson

Georgia Tech

at Miami

at Syracuse

Louisiana

Florida

vs. Oklahoma–Cheez-It Bowl

Rankings

Coaching staff

Awards

Watchlists

Honors

References

Florida State
Florida State Seminoles football seasons
Cheez-It Bowl champion seasons
Florida State Seminoles football